The Norms of El Puig (Valencian: Normes d'El Puig), also known as Norms of the RACV (Valencian: Normes de la RACV),  are the linguistic rules developed by the Royal Academy of Valencian Culture (RACV) (Valencian: Real Acadèmia de Cultura Valenciana) proposed for Valencian treated as an independent language, as opposed to a variety of Catalan. The Norms were presented in 1981 at the Monastery of Santa Maria in El Puig and were drafted with the intention of regulating the Valencian language in accordance with and encompassing both the linguistic reality of present-day Valencian as well as longstanding Valencian literary and orthographic tradition. The Norms of El Puig were the official Valencian standard in the early 80s, and have been promoted by the Valencian Governments at various times. Nowadays, they are used by some publishers, associations and taught by the cultural society Lo Rat Penat that issues its own qualifications in Valencian.

Use
The Norms of El Puig were developed by the Section of Language and Literature of the RACV in 1979 and presented in a formal act in El Puig in 1982. The Norms were made the official standard of Valencian in 1980 by the Valencian President Enrique Monsonís (UCD), and they were particularly promoted by the Councilor of Education of the Valencian Community Amparo Cabanes. That was the time when the Valencian Statue of Autonomy of 1982 was published using these norms for its version in Valencian. The Valencian government enacted that language teachers of Valencian in the educational system had to had a linguistic qualification in these Norms, issued mainly by Lo Rat Penat. Nevertheless, just with the arrival of the Socialist Party in December 1982, the Norms of Castelló, that use the Catalan unitarian linguistic forms, were reintroduced, the Valencian teachers with the qualifications in the normative of the RACV were fired, and its qualifications invalidated. 

In 2015, the Valencian government of the PPCV passed a law to protect Valencian identity features that protected and promoted the Valencian traditions and language. In this law the Norms of El Puig and the RACV were given public protection, promotion and teaching recognition. The opposition accused the Valencian government of being biased and electioneering, and a new Valencian coalition government abrogated the law in 2016.

The Norms of El Puig have had a minority use. Some cultural organisations have used the Norms, like the Junta Central Fallera from 1992 to 1998. Nonetheless, the use of these rules has declined particularly since its substitution by the Normes de Castelló, and the subsequent creation of the Acadèmia Valenciana de la Llengua (AVL) in 1998 which regulates them. In 2004, the production in the Norms of El Puig was two times the production of other minority languages like Aranese and Aragonese, although it was doubled by the production in Asturian.

The Norms of El Puig are still used in different publications related to the Royal Academy of Valencian Culture, association with the patronage of the Spanish Monarchy, and several Valencian cultural and political personalities. The cultural association Lo Rat Penat, and some publishing houses use these norms in its publications. Besides, the rules are defended by a sector of the Valencian regionalism in favour of language secessionism. The Internet has also given new opportunities of diffusion to the Norms of El Puig. There is also an encyclopedia on the Internet created by volunteers using the MediaWiki software, called L'Enciclopèdia in Valencian, which was created in December 2007 and is written using these Norms.

In 2020, Walter de Gruyter published the Manual of Standardization in the Romance Languages, in which devoted a subsection inside the Valencian normative grammars called Other attempts at standardization, where they analysed these rules as "an independent standard based on the secessionist orthography of Normes d'El Puig (1981)". In their conclusion they showed the different codification attempts of Catalan and Valencian linguistics including the New Valencian Grammar (NGLV) (2015) of the RACV.

Orthography
There is significant overlap between the Normes d'El Puig and the AVL's orthographic standards. This section calls out various key differences.

In respect to the alphabet and units of writing (such as digraphs), the main differences come about in terms of:
 the names of the letters
 how the consonants  and the glide  are written
 representation of word-final  originating from voiced consonants
 treatment of various older digraphs and consonant groups

Alphabet 
The table below summarizes the main differences between the two norms as far as the letter names go. Where multiple forms are given in a single cell, the value listed first is the form deemed most preferable in the pertinent standard. The forms given in the "Non-preferred" column are deemed by the RACV as "admissible" but also Castilianisms.

Palatals 

Palatal glide 

The table below compares the two norms in this regard.

Digraphs 

 Most notably, the digraph ch is regularly employed in the RACV's norm to represent  (in addition to its occasional use to represent  in fossilizations, such as in the traditional spellings of certain last names):  ('belly'),  ('chocolate'),  ('child'). Unlike in the AVL's standard where  is normally represented by x and tx.

 Simplification of the digraphs l·l, tl, tll, tm, tn, tg, tj, tz, and the group -mpt- using only the simple letter that already represents its sound, like  being .

 Keeping the use of s in the suffix  like: organisar, normalisat; instead of the digraph tz.

Apostrophe

Unlike in the AVL's standard, however, the feminine definite article  exhibits the aforementioned elision before nominals that begin with unstressed i or u.

Accent marks 
In the function of using accent marks to distinguish homophones or senses, the Norms of El Puig can differ from the AVL's standard in terms of which words are to be accentuated or what senses call for accentuation. Consider the following examples:

Examples of other differences are as follows:
 Words ending in stressed  bear no accent mark, unlike in the AVL's standard.

 The word  ('what') is spelled with an acute accent instead of a grave accent mark, reflecting the Valencian pronunciation with  instead of 

Grammar

Articles
Some key differences present in the RACV's norms compared to the AVL's norms around the articles are as follows:

 Acceptance of the masculine article , a classic form that is widely used only the northernmost parts of the Valencian Community. In general, the Valencian article lo is recommended occasionally after the prepositions en, per and some adverbs: en lo coche, tot lo món ('in the car', 'everybody'). 

 Acceptance of the neuter article  in all registers of the language and as systematically distinct from the masculine article. This form which was already used in the classical language is considered as necessary to avoid confusion: lo bo (meaning something good), el bo (meaning someone good).

Demonstratives
Some differences present in the RACV's norms compared to the AVL's norms around the demonstratives are:

 Permitting that the simple demonstratives  'this' and  'that' be written without the final -e ( and ) before a vowel sound, reflecting the tendency to pronounce them without the final vowel in this context:  ('this summer'),  ('that man').

Possessives
The main divergence between the normms regarding the possessives is that:

 The RACV standard only accepts the feminine form with u like  and does not admit any possessive formed with v. 

 The RACV emphasises much more the use and conservation of the atonic possessives used before kinship, the words casa ('house'), vida ('life'), idioms, and tittles:  ('my mother'),  ('my grandfather'), sos tios ('his/her aunt and uncle'),  ('your life'),  ('His Majesty').

 The possessive for the third person  is an archaic form which is no part of its standard.

Numerals
Some key differences present in the RACV's norms compared to the AVL's norms around the numerals are as follows:

 Deeming of the feminine cardinal form  'two' as obsolete, thereby treating the masculine form  as wholly invariant.

Pronouns
Some key differences present in the RACV's norms compared to the AVL's norms are as follows:

In particular, the RACV deems / and  archaic and "foreign" to present-day Valencian.

 Use of an invariant  ('self, same'), which is otherwise feminine singular, as the sole form for reinforcing reflexive object complements, even when the object is masculine or plural.
  ('He bought it for himself')
  ('They thought about themselves.')

The AVL only recognises the invers form.

 The adverbial pronoun  is an obsolete form which is not included in the RACV's standard. It can only be an impersonal pronoun with the verb .

 Use of the pronoun and adjective  ('other') which is a classical and present Valencian form, and exclusion of  considered a parallel archaic form, which is the one preferred by the AVL's standard.

Verbs
The AVL has included many Valencian verbal particularities in its standard. However, the RACV's standard goes beyond and around verbs include (but are not limited to):

 The forms of the subjunctive and the imperative for the first person-plural and second-person plural in the second conjugation are frequently formed with a as  instead of e.

Unlike the preferred forms of the AVL like .

In addition, the preterit perfect is recommended over the periphastic.

Adverbs
Among characteristics of the RACV's standards around adverbs include (but are not limited to):

 There is divergence in adverbs that indicate temporary nature:  ('before'),  ('after'),  ('soon'),  ('late'),  ('while'),  ('then') etc. Its AVL counterparts  ('before'),  ('after'),  ('soon'),  ('late'),  ('while'),  ('then') are not admitted or not recommended.

On the contrary, la AVL also admits or prefers:  ('forwards'),  ('backwards'),  ('far'),  ('enough'),  ('almost'),  ('too much').

Prepositions and conjunctions
Among characteristics of the RACV's standards around prepositions and conjunctions include (but are not limited to):

In the AVL standard it is prefered only . 

 Some conjunctions are written only in its Valencian form like  ('but'),  ('well'),  ('although').

Text compared

References

External links
 Section of Valencian language and Literature and dictionaries of the Royal Academy of Valencian Culture.

Valencian
Linguistic controversies